Prati can refer to:

 Prati, neighborhood in Rome
 Prati di Tivo, frazione in Pietracamela, Teramo

Surnames
Antonio Prati (1819–1909), Italian painter and scenographer
Edmundo Prati (1889-1970), Uruguayan sculptor
Enrico Prati (1842–1913), Italian painter
Eugenio Prati (1842-1907), Italian painter
Gioacchino Prati (1790-1863), Italian revolutionary and patriot
Giovanni Prati (1815-1884), Italian poet
Lidy Prati (1921–2008), Argentine painter 
Pamela Prati (born 1958), Italian actress and showgirl
Pierino Prati (1946–2020), retired Italian football player